El Zabal is an industrial village and northern suburb of La Línea de la Concepción in the Province of Cádiz, Andalucia, Spain. It lies along the A-353 road. Several companies including Industria Metalica Luis Guitierrez, Guillermo Leiva SI, and Vimar La Linea SL have factories here and historically it was an area of orchards. The Vil Marcha Internacional No Violenta had their headquarters in Casatuya in El Zabal.

References

Populated places in the Province of Cádiz
La Línea de la Concepción